Vermund Larsen (27 February 1909 – 28 February 1970) was a Danish furniture designer and manufacturer. Larsen became known for his work while living in Aalborg, an industrial city in northern Denmark. Larsen is best known for creating Europe's first glass–fiber chair in 1955.

Early life
Vermund Larsen was born in 1909 in Hellerup, a suburb of Copenhagen, Denmark. Larsen moved to Aalborg at age 14 when his father, Captain S. K. Larsen, served in the Danish military in Aalborg. After studying at Aalborg Cathedral School, Larsen became a trainee at M. Kragelund Factories. He then served in the military. Upon completing his service at age 26, he bought P.C. Petersen, an abandoned iron production company, in 1935. At P.C. Petersen, Larsen began working with steel and became interested in steel furniture manufacturing. In 1944, Larsen invented and patented a window lock. The lock was child-proof and had a feather mechanism that theoretically could not be drilled through, thereby making it resistant to break-ins.

Career 

In 1948, Larsen began to focus on the construction of office furniture. Larsen took an interest in office chairs after reading an article in the Journal of Danish Handcraft entitled "The Seated Position - and Chairs" by Dr. Snorason. The article discussed ergonomics and the importance of furniture that supports proper sitting posture.

Larsen then began designing and manufacturing ergonomic desk chairs. In 1951, production consisted of the following categories: barber inventory, ship equipment and office furniture.

Notable accomplishments
 1948–Holmegaard glass competition and Danish Cabinetmakers Guild award
 1955–Europe's first fiberglass chair produced in one pour with Ib
 1956–Design for the so-called "No. 1100" also called the stacking chair
 1960–Design for the new Falck straps
 1960s–Supplied all conductor seats to the Hamburg Hochbahn
 1962–First to use a gas cartridge on a chair for height adjustment
 1964–Design of "118", later VL118
 1966–Design of "VELA Lux", later VL66.
 1969–50% of all sales went to export

Death 
Vermund Larsen died in Aalborg in 1970. His twin sons, Stig and Gorm, ran the company under the name VELA.

Gallery

References

External links 
 Vermund Larsen — Den glemte fabrikant
 Historien bag
 Bo Godt - 2015-01/11

Danish furniture designers
Businesspeople from Copenhagen
20th-century Danish businesspeople
Danish company founders
1909 births
1970 deaths
20th-century Danish inventors